Henry Février (2 October 18756 July 1957) was a French composer.

Biography
Henry Février was born in Paris, France, on 2 October 1875. He married and had a son, the pianist Jacques Février. He studied at the Paris Conservatoire, where his teachers included Jules Massenet and Gabriel Fauré. He also took private lessons with André Messager.

His first compositions were chamber music, but he is chiefly known for his operas and operettas, among which are Le Roi aveugle (1906), Monna Vanna (1909), Carmosine (1913), Gismonda (Chicago 1919), La Damnation de Blanchefleur (1920), L'Ile désenchantée (1925), Oletta (1927), La Femme nue (1929) and Sylvette (1932). His works include incidental music for plays, including Agnès, dame galante (1912) and Aphrodite (1914).  Février ceased composing music in the 1940s. He died on 6 July 1957.

References

Further reading
 Henry Février, André Messager : mon maître, mon ami, Paris, Amiot-Dumont, « Jeunesse de la musique », 1948.
 Hélène Hourrier, Henry Février (1875-1957) : introduction à l’étude de Monna Vanna, mémoire de master 1 sous la direction de Stéphan Etcharry, Université de Reims, 2006.
 Hélène Hourrier, La Production lyrique d'Henry Février : genèse, réception et éléments d'analyse, mémoire de master 2 sous la direction de Jean-Marc Chouvel et Stéphan Etcharry, Université de Reims, 2007.

External links 
 

1875 births
1957 deaths
French operetta composers
French opera composers
Male opera composers
Musicians from Paris
Conservatoire de Paris alumni
Pupils of Jules Massenet
Pupils of Gabriel Fauré
French male classical composers
19th-century French male musicians